Parepilysta strandi is a species of beetle in the family Cerambycidae. It was described by Breuning in 1939.

It's 9 mm long and 2⅔ mm wide, and its type locality is Cenderawasih Bay on the island of New Guinea. It was named in honor of Embrik Strand, in whose Festschrift the species description was written.

References

Apomecynini
Beetles described in 1939
Taxa named by Stephan von Breuning (entomologist)